Calomela is a genus of beetles commonly called leaf beetles and in the family Chrysomelidae.  They are specialist feeders on various species of Acacia and are not reported as a problem species. The beetles are cylindrical when compared with other leaf beetles and their larvae are globose.  Calomela includes about 45 species which are found in all states of Australia.

List of species

The genus includes the following species:
 Calomela acaciae (Lea, 1916)
 Calomela acervata (Blackburn, 1889)
 Calomela aeneonitens (Clark, 1865)
 Calomela apicalis Blackburn, 1889
 Calomela australica (Blackburn, 1893)
 Calomela bartoni (Baly, 1856)
 Calomela cingulata (Baly, 1856)
 Calomela colorata (Germar, 1848)
 Calomela crassicornis (Fabricius, 1775)
 Calomela curtisi (Kirby, 1818)
 Calomela distinguenda Blackburn, 1889
 Calomela eyrei Blackburn, 1890
 Calomela foveicollis (Baly, 1878)
 Calomela fugitiva Lea, 1903
 Calomela fulvilabris (Germar, 1848)
 Calomela gloriosa Lea, 1903
 Calomela imperialis Blackburn, 1893
 Calomela inornata (Baly, 1865)
 Calomela intemerata Lea, 1903
 Calomela ioptera (Baly, 1856)
 Calomela jansoni (Baly, 1865)
 Calomela juncta Lea, 1903
 Calomela laticollis Lea, 1916
 Calomela macleayi (Boisduval, 1835)
 Calomela maculicollis (Boisduval, 1835)
 Calomela micans (Baly, 1876)
 Calomela moorei Chu & Reid, 2018
 Calomela nigra Lea, 1903
 Calomela nigripennis Lea, 1903
 Calomela nitidipennis (Boisduval, 1835)
 Calomela pallida (Baly, 1856)
 Calomela parilis Lea, 1903
 Calomela picticornis Lea, 1929
 Calomela pubiceps (Lea, 1916)
 Calomela pulchella (Baly, 1856)
 Calomela regalis Lea, 1915
 Calomela relicta Reid, 1989
 Calomela ruficeps (Boisduval, 1835)
 Calomela satelles Blackburn, 1893
 Calomela selmani Daccordi, 2003
 Calomela sumptuosa (Selman, 1976)
 Calomela suturalis (Jacoby, 1885)
 Calomela tarsalis Blackburn, 1889
 Calomela testacea Lhoste, 1934
 Calomela vacillans Lea, 1915
 Calomela vittata (Baly, 1856)
 Calomela waterhousei (Baly, 1864)

References

Beetles of Australia
Chrysomelidae genera
Chrysomelinae
Taxa named by Frederick William Hope
Beetles described in 1840